Mortavand (also known as Mūrtavand, Mowrūtak-e Bālā, Murtavand, Murtawand, and Mūrūtak-e Bālā) is a village in Mud Rural District, Mud District, Sarbisheh County, South Khorasan Province, Iran. At the 2006 census, its population was 14, in 6 families.

References 

Populated places in Sarbisheh County